Bessia is the scientific name of several genera of organisms and may also refer to:

 Bessia Raf., a genus of plants now regarded as a synonym of Corypha
 Bessia Pocock, 1900, a genus of spiders now regarded as a synonym of Spiroctenus